Aleksandrs Klinklāvs (February 7, 1899 – October 6, 1982)  was a Latvian architect.

Education
In 1930, he graduated from the University of Latvia Faculty of Architecture.

Career
In early 1930s he started to work in building department of Latvian Red Cross and established his own office of architecture. From 1936 to 1940 he worked in Latvian Chamber of Crafts.
During the World War II he emigrated to Germany and in 1948 he moved to live in Canada. He worked in architect company Barott, Marshall & Meritt, where he was the main designer, in 1959 he became the main designer in Chicago architect company Jensen, Halstead & Rummel.
Klinklāvs participated in the establishment of Latvian Theater of Montreal.
In his list of projects there are various hospitals and public buildings. In Latvia he projected the building of Finance Ministry of Latvia, The Sanatorium of Tērvete, building of G. Ērenpreis Bicycle factory in Riga.

Selected list of buildings by A. Klinklāvs

References 

1899 births
1982 deaths
People from Sēja Municipality
People from Kreis Riga
Latvian architects
20th-century American architects
Latvian World War II refugees
Latvian emigrants to the United States